Bulgarian Secret Central Revolutionary Committee (BSCRC) was a Bulgarian revolutionary organization founded in Plovdiv, then in Eastern Rumelia on February 10, 1885. The original purpose of the committee was to gain autonomy for  the region of Macedonia  (Western Rumelia), but in perspective, the formation of a Balkan federation. According to Ivan Andonov, the committee was established to resolve the Macedonian Question by the initiative of the revolutionary Spiro Kostov, who inspired both, Andonov and Zahari Stoyanov toward  revolutionary activity for the liberation of the Macedonian Bulgarians. However, BSCRC played an important role in the organization of the  Unification of Bulgaria and Eastern Rumelia.

See also

 Secret society

References

1885 in Bulgaria
Political history of Bulgaria
Bulgarian revolutionary organisations
Secret societies in Bulgaria
Macedonia under the Ottoman Empire
1885 establishments in Bulgaria
Organizations established in 1885
Defunct organizations based in Bulgaria
Revolutionary organizations against the Ottoman Empire